Of Darkness... is a debut studio album released in February 1991 by the Swedish band Therion and it contains songs written in  the early years of the band, during the 1980s. The album is indicated by the band itself as an end of its first era.

The album was re-released on 27 November 2000 under Nuclear Blast label as a part of The Early Chapters of Revelation box-set. It contains remastered songs, as well as four bonus tracks.

Recording and production

After releasing the third demo record Time Shall Tell EP in 1990, Therion got attention from the British label Deaf Records, a subsidiary of Peaceville Records, and signed the band's first contract. Of Darkness... was recorded in Swedish studio Sunlight in Stockholm from August to September 1990 and released in February 1991. The initial line-up has not been changed since its last production. The album was produced by Tomas Skogsberg and the band itself.

The title track and the song "Dark Eternity" were not used from the recording session, but were instead taken from the 1990 EP recordings.

Songs, lyrical themes and influences

Of Darkness... consists of songs Christofer Johnsson had written in the years of 1987–1989, many of which were available on the band's demo recordings. Musically, "Of Darkness..." could be described as a typical death metal release, though elements of thrash metal are apparent as well.

Unlike later albums, lyrically, many tracks on the album focus on political and social issues.

2000 re-release album contains original remastered songs, and four bonus tracks songs. Two of them are the 1990 versions from the "Time Shall Tell" EP. The other two are the unreleased versions from the "Of Darkness..." recording sessions.

Reception

The album reviews were mixed. Of Darkness... received a medium rating 2.5 of 5 at Allmusic with "Morbid Reality" and "Megalomania" songs picked by its staff, and 3.02 of 5 at the Rate Your Music community being only number 925 in its 1991 ranking.

Track listing
All tracks were written and composed by Christofer Johnsson.

Personnel
 Therion
Christofer Johnsson – vocals, rhythm guitar
Peter Hansson – lead guitar, rhythm guitar
Oskar Forss – drums
Erik Gustafsson – bass guitar
 Production
Tomas Skogsberg – engineer, producer
Gary Querns – cover art (based on Johan Losand and Rikard Olund's work)

Samples

See also
 Scandinavian death metal

Notes

External links
 Of Darkness... at the official website
 
 

 Audio samples
 Of Darkness... at Amazon.com

1991 debut albums
Therion (band) albums
Deaf Records albums
Nuclear Blast albums